The following is a list of awards and nominations received by American actress and singer-songwriter Lea Michele. Michele's portrayal of Rachel Berry in the comedy-drama series Glee has received much critical praise, earning her two Golden Globe nominations for Best Actress in a Television Series – Comedy or Musical and a Primetime Emmy nomination for Outstanding Lead Actress in a Comedy Series. She has also received a Satellite Award, a Screen Actors Guild Award and three consecutive People's Choice Awards for her performance in the role. Prior to starring in Glee, Michele was the female star of Spring Awakening on Broadway, for which she was nominated for the Drama Desk Award for Outstanding Actress in a Musical.

Theatre awards

Broadway.com Audience Awards

Drama Desk Awards
The Drama Desk Awards are an annual event celebrating excellence in New York City theatre productions.

Film and television awards

Behind the Voice Actors Awards

Dorian Awards

DoSomething Awards

Primetime Emmy Awards
The Primetime Emmy Awards are an annual ceremony celebrating excellence in the television industry.

E! Best. Ever. TV Awards

Gay People's Choice Awards

Glamour Women of the Year Awards

Golden Globe Awards
The Golden Globe Awards are annual events celebrating both the film and television industry.

Golden Nymph Awards

Golden Remote Awards

New York Television Festival Awards

NewNowNext Awards

Nickelodeon Australian Kids' Choice Awards

People's Choice Awards
The People's Choice Awards is an annual awards show recognizing the people and the work of popular culture. The winners are voted for by the general public.

Satellite Awards
The Satellite Awards are annual awards given out by the International Press Academy for excellence in television and film.

Screen Actors Guild Awards
The Screen Actors Guild Award is an accolade given out by SAG-AFTRA, in recognition of excellence in film and primetime television.

Teen Choice Awards
The Teen Choice Awards is an annual event held to honor the biggest achievements in music, movies, sports, television, and fashion. The awards are voted for by teens aged 13 to 19.

TV Guide Awards

TV Land Awards

Music awards

Billboard's Women in Music Awards

Grammy Awards
The Grammy Award is an accolade by the National Academy of Recording Arts and Sciences of the United States to recognize outstanding achievement in the music industry.

Hollywood Music in Media Awards

World Music Awards
The World Music Awards is an international awards show celebrating the world's best-selling artists from each major territory. Nine awards are voted online by the public.

Young Hollywood Awards
The Young Hollywood Awards is an award presented annually which honors the year's biggest achievements in pop music, movies, sports, television, fashion and more, as voted on by teenagers aged 13–19 and young adults.

Honors

DoSomething.org

Giffoni Film Festival

US Glamour Women of the Year Awards

PETA Anniversary Gala

Step Up's Inspiration Awards

Time 100 Most Influential People
The Time 100 is an annual list of the 100 most influential people in the world, assembled by the American news magazine Time.

Variety Power of Women Awards
The Variety Power of Women Awards is an annual event that celebrates Hollywood's most philanthropic and inspiring women.

Victoria's Secret Sexiest

Notes

References

External links
 

Awards
Michele, Lea
Michele, Lea